Bi Sim-e Kamalabad (also Romanized as Bī Sīm-e Kamālābād) is a village in Chahardangeh Rural District, Chaharbagh District, Savojbolagh County, Alborz Province, Iran. At the 2006 census, its population was 223, in 59 families.

References 

Populated places in Savojbolagh County